Violator is a thrash metal band from Brazil, formed in 2002 by Pedro Arcanjo, Pedro Agusto, and David Araya. After 6 years of playing in the metal underground, the band signed with Brazilian label "Kill Again Records" and released their debut album, "Chemical Assault". Then they went on tour through Brazil and later in France, Paraguay, Argentina, Chile, Peru, Uruguay, Venezuela, Japan, Belgium, Mexico and Italy. In 2013, Violator released their most recent studio album, Scenarios of Brutality.

History
The band was formed in 2002 by four men who had the common goal of making music that would add a new modern layer to the already established thrash metal scene.

After a live rehearsal demo (Killer Instinct - 2002), a compilation album (Fast Food Thrash Metal) and plenty of gigs through Distrito Federal (Brazil) and surrounding areas, Violator got the opportunity to travel to Asuncion and play in Paraguay. After that, the band was invited to play as the opening act for German thrash metal pioneers, Destruction and American death metal band, Malevolent Creation.

In the first months of 2004, the band signed with Kill Again Records label and released an EP called Violent Mosh. The release resulted in over 40 concerts in the next two years. Violator traveled through 10 Brazilian states in the Moshing With Violence Tour. One of these concerts was recorded as a DVD for the first edition of Da Tribo Rock Magazine. Violent Mosh was also the first release by the band to be released outside Brazil. The EP was released on cassette in Bolivia by Grim Art Prods. The cassette was limited to 666 copies. In late 2005, the guitarist Juan Leda, had to leave the band to continue his studies in Argentina, his homeland. The farewell show was with Finnish thrashcore band Força Macabra.

As of early 2006 Violator was functioning as a power trio. After six months of recording and editing at Orbis studio in Brasília, the band came out with the first full-length album, Chemical Assault. The album release was also the return of the two guitar line-up, after Márcio Cambito joined the band. The band continued playing concerts in Brazil and in South America. In 2009 they had the opportunity to play at the True Thrash Fest at Osaka, Japan with Hirax, Fastkill, Abigail, Rose Rose, Riverge, Kings of Evil, Code Red, and Impaler. In 2010, Violator released their album, Annihilation Process, continuing on the typical old school thrash metal style that the group has played since it was formed. That EP was the debut in studio of Marcio Cambito. The group toured Europe in the Plunging Into Annihilation Euro Tour 2010 with the American thrashers, Fueled By Fire. The band also released several splits in 2010, Thrashing The Tyrants with Bandanos, Raging Thrash with Hirax, and True Thrash Fest, a DVD that was recorded during their presentation at the True Thrash Fest 2009, and that also includes songs of the other groups that performed on that year's fest edition.

In early 2011, Violator recorded their first official video, of the song Futurephobia, that is part of the album Annihilation Process.

Band members

Current members
Pedro Arcanjo - bass and vocals (2002–present)
Pedro Augusto - guitar (2002–present)
Marcelo Cambito - guitar (2005–present)
David Araya - drums (2002–present)

Former Members
Juan Lerda - guitar (2002–2005)

Timeline

Discography

Demos
 Killer Instinct (Demo) - 2002

EP
 Violent Mosh (EP) - 2004

Albums
 Chemical Assault (LP) 2006
 Annihilation Process (LP) 2010
 Scenarios of Brutality (LP) 2013

Splits
 Fast-Food Thrash Metal (Split LP) - 2003 - With the bands Revival, Tsavo, and Temenon
 Violent War (Split LP) - 2005 - With the band Bywar
 Raging Thrash (Split EP) 2010 - With the band Hirax
 Thrashing The Tyrants (Split LP) 2010 - With the band Bandanos

Contributed tracks to
Thrashing Like a Maniac (Compilation, 2007)

References

External links
Violator on Facebook

Brazilian thrash metal musical groups
Earache Records artists
Musical groups established in 2002
Musical quartets
2002 establishments in Brazil